The thirteenth and final Inter-Cities Fairs Cup was played over the 1970–71 season. The competition was won by Leeds United for the second time, over two legs, in the final against Juventus. It was the first time the competition final had been won on the away goals rule. The competition was abolished and replaced the next season by the UEFA Cup. The Inter-Cities Fairs trophy was finally won in a play-off between the first and last competition winners: CF Barcelona and Leeds United, respectively.

First round

|}

First leg

Second leg

Twente won 4–0 on aggregate.

Eskişehirspor won 3–2 on aggregate.

Barcelona won 4–2 on aggregate.

Arsenal won 4–2 on aggregate.

Fiorentina won 3–1 on aggregate.

Leeds won 6–0 on aggregate.

Sparta Rotterdam won 15–0 on aggregate.

Newcastle United won 3–1 on aggregate.

Pécsi won 4–2 on aggregate.

Valencia won 6–1 on aggregate.

Sparta Prague won 3–1 on aggregate.

Dundee United won 3–2 on aggregate.

Juventus won 11–0 on aggregate.

Dinamo București won 5–1 on aggregate.

Coventry City won 6–1 on aggregate.

Second round

|}

First leg

Second leg

2–2 on aggregate; Leeds United won on away goals.

1. FC Köln won 3–1 on aggregate.

Juventus won 4–2 on aggregate.

Liverpool won 4–1 on aggregate.

The referee called the end of the game three minutes before the regulation time and had to abandon the pitch escorted out by Beveren's players because of the pressure and the protests by the visiting team as a result of his decision. K.S.K. Beveren won 2–1 on aggregate.

Sparta Prague won 3–2 on aggregate.

Sparta Rotterdam won 4–1 on aggregate.

Third round

|}

First leg

Second leg

Bayern Munich won 5–2 on aggregate.

Juventus won 3–0 on aggregate.

Leeds won 9–2 on aggregate.

Quarter-finals

|}

First leg

Second leg

Juventus won 4–2 on aggregate.

Leeds won 3–2 on aggregate.

2–2 on aggregate; 1. FC Köln won on away goals.

Liverpool won 4–1 on aggregate.

Semi-finals

|}

First leg

Second leg

Juventus won 3–1 on aggregate.

Leeds won 1–0 on aggregate.

Final

First leg

Game abandoned in the 51st minute due to heavy rain and waterlogged pitch.

Replay

Second leg

3–3 on aggregate; Leeds United won on away goals.

References

External links
 Inter-Cities Fairs Cup results at Rec.Sport.Soccer Statistics Foundation
 Inter-Cities Fairs Cup Seasons 1970-71 – results, protocols
 website eurocups-uefa.ru Fairs' Cup Seasons 1970-71 – results, protocols
 website Football Archive 1970–71 Fairs' Cup

2
Inter-Cities Fairs Cup seasons